Adelaide Secondary School of English is co-located with the School of Languages  west of the city of Adelaide.

It is the only Government School for permanent, temporary and overseas full fee paying secondary students aged between 12 and 18 years who are newly arrived in South Australia, providing opportunities for students to develop their English skills.

Curriculum 
Students learn English through a range of curriculum subjects and senior students are given the opportunity to gain SACE credits for completing the PLP (Personal Learning Plan) and EALD across the curriculum (Intensive English Language program).

Subjects provided by the school include: English as an Additional Language or Dialect (EALD), Maths, History, Geography, Health and Personal Learning and Wellbeing (PLW), Science, Design Technology,  Physical Education, Visual and Dramatic Arts, Home Economics, Woodwork and Gardening, as well as select SACE Stage 1 subjects including Personal Learning Program (PLP), Integrated Learning (Citizenship) and Community Studies.

The wellbeing of students is also an important focus of the school. Students are provided with a range of wellbeing activities and sports that heighten their connection to the school (and wider) community, and further supports their transition to their new lives in Australia. Students are given frequent opportunities to engage in active learning activities and community service, reflecting the school values of Respect, Responsibility and Resilience.

References 

Secondary schools in Adelaide
Public schools in South Australia